Zhengzhou–Xuzhou high-speed railway, or Zhengxu Passenger Dedicated Line, is a high-speed rail line operated by China Railway Shanghai Group and China Railway Zhengzhou Group, connecting the cities of Zhengzhou, the provincial capital of Henan, and Xuzhou in northern Jiangsu.

The length of the railway is 362.39 kilometers and the investment is estimated to be CN¥48.62 billion. It is one of the segments of the Xuzhou-Lanzhou HSR Corridor, a high-speed railway corridor from Lanzhou to Xuzhou, paralleling the existing Longhai Railway. Presently, the existing conventional-speed Xuzhou-Zhengzhou railway is used e.g. by passenger trains traveling from Shanghai and Nanjing to Xi'an, Lanzhou, and points west.

Construction on the line began in December 2012, and running operations began on 10 September 2016.

Stations
The railway line has nine stations:
 Zhengzhou East 
 Kaifeng North
 Lankao South
 Minquan North
 Shangqiu
 Dangshan South
 Yongcheng North
 Xiaoxian North
 Xuzhou East

References 

High-speed railway lines in China
Standard gauge railways in China
1